Olsi Teqja (born 27 July 1988) is an Albanian professional footballer who plays as a centre-back for Championnat National 2 club Chambly.

Club career

Bylis Ballsh
On 22 August 2011, Teqja joined Albanian Superliga side Bylis Ballsh. He debuted for the first time in Albanian Superliga with Bylis Ballsh on 10 September 2011, playing full-90 minutes in a 5–2 thrashing of Shkumbini Peqin at Adush Muça Stadium. Later, on 17 December 2011, Teqja scored his first Bylis Ballsh goal in a 4–2 home victory against newly promoted side Tomori Berat. Bylis Ballsh ended the first part of 2011–12 season in a comfortable 6th place.

Teqja played his first match for 2012 on 11 February, playing full-90 minutes in a 1–1 away draw against Shkumbini Peqin, receiving a yellow card in the 59th minute. On 31 March, he scored against Tirana, which was proved to the lone goal of the match. Teqja ended his first season with Bylis with 29 appearances in all competitions, including 17 in league, with Bylis finishing the league in 6th place and reaching the quarter-finals of Albanian Cup.

Tirana
On 12 July 2015, Tirana completed the signing of Teqja from Laçi on a two-year contract for an undisclosed fee. He said that the move to Tirana was "a dream come true". He made his Tirana debut on 23 August in the opening league match of 2015–16 season against the newly promoted side Tërbuni Pukë, playing the entire match in a 2–1 away win. Following the end of 2016–17 season where Tirana was relegated for the first time in history, Teqja decided not to extend his contract, becoming a free agent in the process.

Shkëndija
On 16 June 2017, Teqja moved for the first time aboard by joining Shkëndija of Tetovo on a one-year contract with an option of a further one. He spent the summer playing in the qualifying rounds of UEFA Europa League, making 5 appearances as Shkëndija reached the play-offs for the second consecutive year. Teqja played his first domestic match on 21 August by starting in the 3–0 away win over Shkupi in the league's second matchday. He played 19 matches in the championship as Shkëndija was crowned champions for the second time in history; in addition he also played one cup match as Shkëndija made they way to the final, beating Pelister in the final, to win the trophy for the second time and to complete the domestic double. Following the end of the season, Teqja didn't trigger the renew option due to not agreeing on financial terms, leaving the club after only one season.

Kamza
On 4 August 2018, Teqja was presented as the newest player of Kamza, returning in Albanian top flight after only one season.

Kukësi
Kukësi announced on 31 January 2019, that Teqja had signed with the club for 18 months.

Beauvais
On 22 July 2020, French club Beauvais announced the signing of Teqja on free transfer.

Career statistics

Honours
Laçi
 Albanian Cup: 2014–15

Tirana
 Albanian Cup: 2016–17

Shkëndija
Macedonian First Football League: 2017–18
Macedonian Football Cup: 2017–18

References

External links

1988 births
Living people
Footballers from Tirana
Albanian footballers
Association football defenders
KF Olimpik Tirana players
KS Kastrioti players
KF Apolonia Fier players
KF Bylis Ballsh players
KF Laçi players
KF Tirana players
KF Shkëndija players
FC Kamza players
FK Kukësi players
AS Beauvais Oise players
FC Chambly Oise players
Kategoria e Parë players
Kategoria Superiore players
Championnat National 2 players
Albanian expatriate footballers
Expatriate footballers in North Macedonia
Albanian expatriate sportspeople in North Macedonia
Expatriate footballers in France
Albanian expatriate sportspeople in France